The Sumathi Best Teledrama Makeup Artist Award is presented annually in Sri Lanka by the Sumathi Group for the best Sri Lankan makeup artist in television.

The award was first given in 1995. Following is a list of the winners since then.

References

Makeup Artist
Awards established in 1995
Makeup awards